Mayo Memorial and Town Hall (commonly Mayo Hall) is a large meeting hall in Prayagraj, situated near the Thornhill Mayne Memorial, having a 180 feet high tower . The interior of this memorial hall was ornamented with designs by Professor Gamble of the South Kensington Museum, London. Mayo Memorial Hall was designed by Richard Roskell Bayne and was completed in 1879. The hall was meant for public meetings, balls and receptions in commemoration of the assassinated Viceroy Mayo.

See also
 List of tourist attractions in Prayagraj

References

Buildings and structures in Allahabad
Buildings and structures completed in 1879
1879 establishments in India